The following is a list of equipment currently in use with the Iraqi Ground Forces.  For a list of previous equipment, please see List of former equipment of the Iraqi Army.

Infantry weapons

Handguns

Submachine guns and personal defence weapons

Assault and battle rifles

Sniper and anti-materiel rifles

Machine guns

Portable guided missiles

Protective gear

Vehicles and artillery

Armoured fighting vehicles

Rockets and artillery

Anti-aircraft

Radar systems

Army Aviation 
These are aircraft in Iraqi Ground Forces command. For other aircraft see List of active aircraft of the Iraqi Air Force page.

See also 

 Iraqi Aircraft inventory

References 

Military equipment of Iraq
Iraq
Iraqi Ground Forces
Equipment